Stenoglene basquini is a moth in the family Eupterotidae. It was described by Thierry Bouyer in 2012. It is found in the Central African Republic.

References

Moths described in 2012
Janinae